Zidong Wang from Brunel University London, Uxbridge, UK was named Fellow of the Institute of Electrical and Electronics Engineers (IEEE) in 2014 for contributions to networked control and complex networks.

References

Fellow Members of the IEEE
Living people
Academics of Brunel University London
British electrical engineers
Year of birth missing (living people)
Place of birth missing (living people)